Bijori Barkatullah is a Bangladeshi television actress and dancer.

Early life
Barkatullah graduated from the Department of History at the University of Dhaka.

Career
Barkatullah acted her first drama, Shukher Chharpotro, directed by her father Mohammad Barkatullah in 1988. She got her breakthrough by her performance in the drama serial Kothao Keu Nei. Later she acted in Megh Kalo with Mahfuz Ahmed, directed by Abdus Sattar. She acted in a play based on the movie Jibon Theke Neya by Zahir Raihan.

Bijori is also engaged in modeling and dancing.

Personal life
Bijori is the daughter of Mohammad Barkatullah and Zeenat Barkatullah. Mohammad was a dance artist who later turned into a television producer. Zeenat is also a dance artist who won Bangladesh Shilpakala Academy award in 2008. Bijori's sister Kajori Barkatullah is a producer and a host.

Barkatullah married Intekhab Dinar, another Bangladeshi actor, on April 14, 2013. She was previously married to Shawkat Ali Emon, a music director, from 1995 until 2012. They have a daughter – Urbana Shawkat.

Works
Television 
 Chharpotro
 Oh Boy
 Kothao Keu Nei
 Megh Kalo
 Batighar
 Autri
 Corporate
 Mukh o Mukhorata
 Kachhakachhi
Film
 Aynabaji (2017) - Special Appearance 
Web Series
 Karagar (2022)
 Jodi Ami Beche Firi (2022) - Shahnaz

References

External links 

 
 

Living people
Bangladeshi female models
Bangladeshi stage actresses
Bangladeshi film actresses
University of Dhaka alumni
Bangladeshi television actresses
21st-century Bangladeshi women singers
21st-century Bangladeshi singers
Bangladeshi female dancers
Bangladeshi choreographers
Year of birth missing (living people)
Place of birth missing (living people)
20th-century Bangladeshi women singers
20th-century Bangladeshi singers